Shatt may refer to:
the Shatt people
the Shatt language
the Shatt al-Arab river, which empties into the Persian Gulf
Chott